Andreas Gruber may refer to:

 Andreas Gruber (1859-1922), German victim of the Hinterkaifeck murders
 Andreas Gruber (director) (born 1954), Austrian film director and screenwriter
 Andreas Gruber (footballer) (born 1996), Austrian footballer

See also
 Andrea Gruber (born 1966), American dramatic soprano